The Lussier River is a tributary of the Kootenay River in the Canadian province of British Columbia. It is part of the Columbia River basin, as the Kootenay River is a tributary of the Columbia River.

It was named by David Thompson in 1808 after one of his men who had lost his kit in the Moyie River.

Course
The Lussier River originates in Top of the World Provincial Park. It flows north to Whiteswan Lake Provincial Park, by Lussier Hot Springs, then south, joining the Kootenay River at Skookumchuck.

See also
List of British Columbia rivers
Tributaries of the Columbia River

References

Rivers of British Columbia
Tributaries of the Kootenay River
Kootenay Land District